, also known as Ishigakijima, is a Japanese island south-west of Okinawa Hontō and the second-largest island of the Yaeyama Island group, behind Iriomote Island. It is within the City of Ishigaki in Okinawa Prefecture. The city functions as the business and transport center of the archipelago. The island is served by New Ishigaki Airport, the largest airport in the Yaeyamas.

Much of the island and surrounding waters including Mount Omoto and Kabira Bay are protected as part of Iriomote-Ishigaki National Park.

History
A tsunami of record height hit Ishigaki Island in 1771.

Ishigaki Port
Ishigaki Port is the 5th most popular of Japan's cruise ports as of 2017, and 4th for port calls by non-Japanese ships with a weekly call by Star Cruises from Taiwan. Several companies offer daily ferry service to Hateruma, Iriomote, Kohama, and Taketomi Island.

Due to Japan's increased focus on grey-zone challenges, Ishigaki Port has been expanded so more than a dozen large (over 1,000 tons) Japan Coast Guard ships can be stationed there. There are currently 11 Kunigami-class large patrol vessels and 2 Hateruma-class  large patrol vessels, as well as a Bizan-class small patrol vessel, and a Kagayuki-class patrol craft have been homeported at Ishigaki along with facilities for housing up to 600 crew, making Ishigaki JCG's largest base, surpassing JCG's facilities in Yokohama.

Tokyo has currently earmarked ¥21.2 billion yen (US$205 million) in FY2021 to build new patrol boats and buy helicopters for the region, with plans to assign 22 ships of over 1,000 tons (including the 3 Tsugarus, a Kunigami, and a Hateruma class patrol vessel based in Naha) in the region by 2024. Tokyo has also bulked up the JCG presence on Miyako-jima between Ishigaki and Naha with nine Shimoji-class small patrol vessels and a Tokara-class medium patrol vessel

The Japan Self-Defense Forces (JSDF) are also considering deploying short range anti-ship missiles (possibly the Type 96 Multi-Purpose Missile System) on the island.

China (People's Republic of China), and to lesser extent Taiwan (Republic Of China), have challenged Japan's sovereignty over these islands since 1972, with more intensity since 2012.

Culture
 Miyaradunchi is a residence erected around 1819 by the local governor, it has been designated an Important Cultural Property as representative of the architecture of the Yaeyama Islands.

Food
Ishigaki has different cuisine from mainland Japan. Due to the relative warmth of the surrounding sea and various cultural influences, the food of Ishigaki and Okinawa is more meat-centered than the rest of Japan. The Ryukyu Kingdom served as an important trading post between Japan and the rest of the world despite various trading bans between Japan and China.

Located only  from Taiwan, Okinawan cuisine is best defined by the Okinawan word Chanpurū (チャンプルー)  or "something mixed", incorporating aspects of Chinese, Japanese, Southeast Asian, and American cultures. Although Okinawa is best known for its love of pig, Ishigaki is famous for its Japanese Black cattle, both which are thought to have originally been brought from China as far back as the Yayoi period. Ishigaki is also unique in its use of spice and tropical fruits mainland Japanese palates tend to be unaccustomed with.

Flora
Satakentia liukiuensis, the only species in the genus Satakentia, is a palm tree that is endemic to the two islands of Ishigaki and Iriomote in the Yaeyama Islands.

Gallery

See also

 Iriomote
 Taketomi
 Tourism in Japan

References

External links

 Guide for Ishigaki island 
 Ishigaki island vacation activities 
 English language guide to Ishigaki island
 Ishigaki City official website

Islands of Okinawa Prefecture
Japan Self-Defense Forces
Populated coastal places in Japan
Port settlements in Japan
Yaeyama Islands